Jalan Mengkarak-Paluh Hinai (Pahang state route C8, C130 and C108) is a  long state route in Pahang, and a major road in Pahang, Malaysia.

List of junctions

References

Roads in Pahang